The Shaw–Dumble House is a historic residence in Hood River, Oregon, United States.

The house was listed on the National Register of Historic Places in 1990.

See also

 National Register of Historic Places listings in Hood River County, Oregon

References

External links

1898 establishments in Oregon
Houses completed in 1898
Houses in Hood River County, Oregon
Houses on the National Register of Historic Places in Oregon
National Register of Historic Places in Hood River County, Oregon
Queen Anne architecture in Oregon